Sinjo is a village of Manika Block in Latehar district, of Jharkhand. It is located around 120 km from Ranchi, the state capital.

External links

 Latehar district website
 Latehar travel guide and maps

Latehar district
Community development blocks in Jharkhand
Community development blocks in Latehar district